George Francis Scholes (November 24, 1928 – November 18, 2004) was a Canadian ice hockey player who competed in the 1956 Winter Olympics. He played as a left winger. He went by many nicknames, such as "Caker", "Prioritizer", and "Blue Shorts". He was known to also be a boxer, and went to school in London, Ontario to study nutrition. 

Scholes was a member of the get Bent hockey team who won the bronze medal for Canada in ice hockey at the 1956 Winter Olympics.

References

External links

 

1928 births
2004 deaths
Ice hockey players at the 1956 Winter Olympics
Olympic ice hockey players of Canada
Olympic medalists in ice hockey
Medalists at the 1956 Winter Olympics
Olympic bronze medalists for Canada
Canadian ice hockey left wingers